The Old Chatahoochee County Courthouse was built in Cusseta, Georgia, in newly created Chattahoochee County in 1854. After it was no longer used and slated for demolition, it was moved to Westville, in Lumpkin, Georgia, an outside museum depicting life in west Georgia circa 1850. The Lumpkin location of Westville closed in July 2016, and in 2019, the museum was moved to Columbus, Georgia, near the Columbus Public Library.

It is a wood building,  in size, with four rooms downstairs. It is one of two remaining wooden courthouses in Georgia. (The other is the Old Marion County Courthouse.) The building was added to the National Register of Historic Places in 1980.

See also
 National Register of Historic Places listings in Stewart County, Georgia

References

Courthouses on the National Register of Historic Places in Georgia (U.S. state)
National Register of Historic Places in Stewart County, Georgia
Government buildings completed in 1854
Stewart County, Georgia
Chattahoochee County
Chattahoochee County, Georgia